State Highway 15 (abbreviated SH-15 or OK-15) is the name for two once-connected state highways in Oklahoma. One begins at the Texas state line and runs for 47.1 miles (75.8 km) through Woodward; the other runs for 62.4 miles (100.4 km) between U.S. Highway 64/U.S. Highway 412 and State Highway 18 north of Pawnee. SH-15 has no lettered spur routes.

Route descriptions

Western section
The western SH-15 begins at the Texas state line, connecting to Texas' State Highway 15 between Catesby and Shattuck. It runs east for seven miles (11.2 km) to US-283, which it overlaps into Shattuck. In Shattuck, SH-15 splits off to the northeast, heading through Gage and Fargo, before ending in Woodward.

Eastern section

The eastern SH-15 picks up a US-64/412 south of Garber, and begins concurrent with State Highway 74 heading northbound. It splits from SH-74 to head through Billings and has an interchange with Interstate 35 at milemarker 203. It then has a five-mile (8.0 km) concurrency with U.S. Highway 77. After leaving US-77, it passes through Red Rock, and has a  concurrency with US-177, and splits off just north of the intersection with the Cimarron Turnpike. It bridges Sooner Lake and runs for 15 more miles (24 more km) before ending at State Highway 18 north of Pawnee.

History
The two sections of SH-15 were once connected into one highway. However, when U.S. Highway 412 was commissioned, the middle section of highway (from Woodward to Garber) was redesignated as US-412, and SH-15 decommissioned through that section.

Junction list

Western section

Eastern section

References

External links

Western SH-15 at Roadklahoma
Eastern SH-15 at Roadklahoma

015
Transportation in Ellis County, Oklahoma
Transportation in Woodward County, Oklahoma
Transportation in Garfield County, Oklahoma
Transportation in Noble County, Oklahoma
Transportation in Pawnee County, Oklahoma